Thong Dee Fun Khao is a 2017 Thai Action film, directed by Bin Bunluerit.

Plot
Action movie based on history “Thong Dee Fun Khao” (Also Known As Legend of the Broken Sword Hero) Tells the story of an indomitable determination, courage, loyalty, the importance of life. “Thong Dee Fun Khao” heart tough fighter with boxing ability and fate led him to be a loyal soldier of King Taksin the Great. And martyrs fight to defend the country to become a hero of the Thai people known “Phraya Phichai Dap Hak”.

Cast
 Buakaw Banchamek as Thongdee
 Phutharit Prombandal as Taksin
 Sornsin Maneewan as Ramyong
 Nantawut Boonrubsub as Cherd
 Vannapoom Songsuparp as Boonkerd
 Chutirada Junthit as Mauylek
 Phutharit Prombandal as Rueang
 Jaran Ngamdee as Khru How

Release
The film premiered on 9 February 2017 (Thailand)

References

External links

2017 films
Thai-language films
Muay Thai films
Thai Muay Thai films
2017 action films
Thai action films